

Boston, Massachusetts is home to many listings on the National Register of Historic Places. This list encompasses those locations that are located north of the Massachusetts Turnpike. See National Register of Historic Places listings in southern Boston for listings south of the Turnpike. Properties and districts located elsewhere in Suffolk County's other three municipalities are also listed separately.

There are 341 properties and districts listed on the National Register in Suffolk County, including 58 National Historic Landmarks. The northern part of the city of Boston is the location of 148 of these properties and districts, including 44 National Historic Landmarks.

Current listings

|}

Former listing

|}

See also
 List of National Historic Landmarks in Massachusetts
 National Register of Historic Places listings in Suffolk County, Massachusetts

References

Northern